Starcke is a coastal locality in the Shire of Cook, Queensland, Australia. In the  Starcke had a population of 3 people.

It is in the Australian Eastern Standard time zone.

Geography
Large areas of Starcke are protected areas being within the Cape Melville National Park, Muundhi National Park, Biniirr National Park, Juunju Daarrba Nhirrpan National Park, and Daarrba National Park.

History 
The locality was named after the Starcke cattle property.

In the  Starcke had a population of 3 people.

Education
There are no schools in Starcke. The nearest primary school is the Hopevale Campus of the Cape York Aboriginal Australian Academy in neighbouring Hope Vale to the south-east. Given the size of Starcke, this school might be too distant to attend. There are no secondary schools nearby Starcke. Distance education and boarding school are other options.

See also

 Starcke National Park

References 

Shire of Cook
Localities in Queensland
Protected areas of Queensland